, was a Japanese actor active in kabuki, other forms of live theatre, television and commercials. Kanzaburō was a versatile actor whose credits include farce, period pieces and Shin Kabuki.

Lineage
Kanzaburō was the eighteenth in the line of Nakamura Kanzaburō, his father the seventeenth. Kanzaburō actually traced his ancestry within the Nakamuraya kabuki guild back to his great-great-great grandfathers, if not further. Both his grandfathers were kabuki actors, as were their fathers.

Kanzaburō was the younger brother of film actress Kuriko Namino. With his wife Yoshie, he had two sons, Nakamura Kankurō VI and Nakamura Shichinosuke II. Both perform kabuki, and in other venues.

Life and career
He made his debut under the name Nakamura Kankurō V in April 1959 in the role of Momotaro. His kabuki credits under that name include roles in Kagami-jishi, Kamiyui Shinza and Yotsuya Kaidan.

He erected it, and performed on it, in Asakusa (Tokyo), Osaka, and, in 2004, on a US tour, performing in Boston, New York, and Washington DC. The Heisei Nakamura-za performed again in New York and Washington in 2007.

He made his film debut at age four in Thus Another Day (1959), which also starred his father. Noteworthy television roles include Imagawa Yoshimoto in the 1988 Taiga drama Takeda Shingen, Oishi Kuranosuke in the 1999 Taiga drama Genroku Ryoran, Terumasa Ikeda in 武蔵 MUSASHI (2003), and a TBS special Koyoi wa KANKURO. Commercial endorsements include Contac, Japan Post, JT, Suntory and  Tokyo Mitsubishi Bank.

He took the name Kanzaburō at a shūmei on March 3, 2005.

Illness and Death
In June 2011, Kanzaburō revealed to the public that he was suffering from esophageal cancer, and was receiving treatment. On December 5, 2012, Kanzaburō died from acute respiratory distress, four months before the Kabuki-za re-opened in Tokyo.

Awards and honors
 2002 Golden Arrow Award
 2004 Kikuchi Kan Prize
 2008 Medal of Honor with purple ribbon
 2012 Order of the Rising Sun, 3rd Class, Gold Rays with Neck Ribbon (posthumous)

Notes

References
Nakamura Kanzaburō XVIII at Kabuki21.com

Kabuki actors
Male actors from Tokyo
1955 births
2012 deaths
Taiga drama lead actors